Bedar may refer to:

Bedar (ship), traditional double-ended Malay ship
Bédar, municipality of Almería province in Spain
Bedar (Kabul), delegate to Afghanistan's Constitutional Loya Jirga
Alternative name for the Ramoshi, Indian community of Maharashtra, Madhya Pradesh, and Karnataka

See also
Bader (disambiguation)
Beder (disambiguation)